is a railway station on the Tokyo Metro Tozai Line in the city of Ichikawa, Chiba, Japan. It is operated by Tokyo Metro.

Lines
Myōden Station is managed by the Tokyo Metro Tozai Line.

Station layout
This station is composed of two elevated island platforms that serves four tracks on the third floor. The trains travel to Nishi-Funabashi depart from either Track 1 or Track 2. The trains travel to Nakano depart from either Track 3 or Track 4. Trains depart from track 1 and 4.

Platforms

History
Myoden Station was established as Shimo-Myoden Signal Station (ja:下妙典信号場) by the Teito Rapid Transit Authority which was timed to be coincided with the Tozai Line extended to Nishi-Funabashi Station and opening to traffic on March 29, 1969. It had been used as a rail yard as the first/last trains depart/arrive from/at Gyōtoku station were parked. Construction for responding to a passenger-accessible station had not done until February 1997. Myōden Station was officially opened on January 22, 2000.

In 2004 the station's facilities were inherited by Tokyo Metro after the privatization of the Teito Rapid Transit Authority (TRTA).

Passenger statistics
In 2019's fiscal year, the station saw a daily average of 53,009 passengers.

Bus services

See also
 List of railway stations in Japan

Notes

References

External links

 Tokyo Metro station information 

 Railway stations in Chiba Prefecture
 Stations of Tokyo Metro
 Tokyo Metro Tozai Line
 Railway stations in Japan opened in 2000
 Ichikawa, Chiba